The Great Synagogue of Marseille is a synagogue on Rue Breteuil in the 6th arrondissement of Marseille. It is classed as a monument historique since 2007.

When the previous synagogue on the Rue Grignan was in disrepair and too small, a campaign began in 1855 to raise money for a new site. The design by the architect Nathan Salomon was approved in 1860 and the building finished in 1864.

The synagogue takes the basilica form more commonly associated with ancient Greece and Rome, and churches. It is built in the Romano-Byzantine style, and takes influence from the Synagogue de Nazareth, completed in Paris in 1852. A pulpit and an organ  – both also associated more with Christian buildings than Jewish ones – feature inside, and the mix of Western and Oriental designs was chosen to reflect the diversity of the worshippers.

Interior Minister Bernard Cazeneuve visited the synagogue in January 2016, in solidarity with a local teacher who was attacked by a teenage Islamic State sympathiser. In September 2018, former President of France Nicolas Sarkozy spoke at the synagogue to denounce antisemitism.

References

Jews and Judaism in Marseille
Marseille
Buildings and structures completed in 1864
Monuments historiques of Marseille
6th arrondissement of Marseille